Nine News Queensland is the flagship state-based news bulletin of the Nine Network in Brisbane. It is screened across Queensland on weeknights, while on weekends it is also screened on a half-hour delay in the Northern Territory. Like all Nine News bulletins, the Queensland bulletin runs for one hour, from 6PM every day. It comprises local, national and international news, as well as sport, weather and finance.

Unlike the other four metropolitan bulletins, this local edition of Nine News is addressed on-air by its state rather than its city.

Simulcast
The 6pm bulletin is simulcast in Brisbane on commercial radio station River 94.9, across regional Queensland on the WIN Network as well as through Nine Darwin (on weekends only) and throughout remote eastern and central Australia on Imparja Television.

History
Bruce Paige and Heather Foord co-anchored the 6pm bulletin from 1995 until 2001, when Foord joined Mike London as a weekend presenter and Jillian Whiting replaced her on weeknights. London resigned in June 2003 after allegations emerged that he had organised a female friend to complain about the presentation of weeknight presenter Bruce Paige. Foord and Whiting swapped positions in 2004 with Melissa Downes taking over as weekend presenter in 2006.

Foord resigned as weeknight presenter on 5 December 2008 and was replaced by Melissa Downes on weeknights with Eva Milic and former ABC news presenter Andrew Lofthouse fronting weekend bulletins. A year later, Bruce Paige stepped down from the weeknight chair (he was replaced by Lofthouse) and Heather Foord returned to present weekend bulletins solo for two years. Paige returned to full-time newsreading in January 2012, fronting Nine Gold Coast News solo until he was paired with Wendy Kingston in July 2016.

In February 2018, in a minor network reshuffle, Alison Ariotti stepped down from the Weekend role. Darren Curtis anchored the bulletin before he was replaced by then-Nine News Regional Queensland presenter Jonathan Uptin.

In January 2023, long-serving sports presenter Wally Lewis resigned from the role, citing health concerns. He was replaced by Jonathan Uptin, who formerly presented the weekend news between 2018 and 2022. His position was subsequently taken over by Mia Glover.

Ratings
Throughout the 1990s, and right up until the mid-2000s, Nine News Queensland was the clear-cut ratings leader in Brisbane. However, when weatherman John Schluter resigned just short of what would have been his 25th anniversary with the Nine Network towards the end of 2006 (subsequently joining the rival Seven News Brisbane), sports presenter Wally Lewis took sick leave after collapsing on-air during a nightly bulletin in November of the same year, and rival Seven Brisbane poached then-Today news presenter Sharyn Ghidella from Nine shortly after to read its weekend news (and later weeknights), the ratings declined, and in 2007, Nine News Queensland would lose its long-standing ratings dominance in the local market to the rival Seven News Brisbane. After Andrew Lofthouse and Melissa Downes took over as the chief co-presenters in mid-2009, Nine News Queensland would start to chip away at Seven's lead, and by 2013 they would reclaim its mantle as the top-rating news bulletin in Brisbane. As of 2018, Nine News Queensland has lost its ratings lead to Seven News Brisbane once again.

"Choppergate" controversy
The Nine News Queensland bulletins on 20 and 21 August 2011 included live coverage each night by reporters Melissa Mallet and Cameron Price, respectively, from the station's helicopter, which they claimed was "near Beerwah", where the remains of murdered schoolboy Daniel Morcombe had been found earlier that month. The reports were revealed to be fake when, on the second night, rival station Channel Seven recorded video of the Nine helicopter sitting on the helipad outside their studios at Mount Coot-tha at the time of the broadcast. Both Mallet and Price, as well as news producer Aaron Wakeley, were sacked by the Nine Network following the incident, and news director Lee Anderson accepted responsibility and resigned over the faked reports. Despite the scandal, Nine experienced a spike in its 6:00 pm news ratings in the weeks that followed, managed to win more weeks than it did in the previous three years combined (winning seven of the 32 ratings weeks up to the first week of October), and recovered to reclaim its mantle as Queensland's most-watched news service by 2013.

Current Presenters

Fill-in presenters 
The primary fill-in anchors are Jonathan Uptin and Paul Taylor. Other fill-in presenters include
 Michael Atkinson (sport)
 Luke Bradnam (weather)
 Ebony Cavallaro (weather)
 Tracey Atkins (weather)

Past Presenters

News
 Bruce Paige (1985–1990, 1993–2009)
 Heather Foord (1989–2008, 2009–2011)
 Mike London (1986–2003)
 Jillian Whiting (1998–2008)
 Eva Milic (2009, July 2011 – October 2014)
 Darren Curtis (October 2014 – February 2018)
 Alison Ariotti (October 2014 – February 2018)
 Sophie Walsh (first half of 2016)
 Frank Warrick (1984 - 1985)
 Don Seccombe (1960's - 1985)
 Paul Griffin (1973 - 1983)

Sport
 Chris Bombolas
 Steve Haddan
 Ian Healy
 Sam Squiers
 Wally Lewis

Weather
 Sami Lukis
 Joseph May
 John Schluter
 Frank Warrick

Reporters

News 

 Tim Arvier (state political reporter, investigative reporter)
 Ebony Cavallaro (court reporter)
 Jessica Millward
 Peter Fegan (investigative reporter)
 Emily Prain (crime reporter)
 Jordan Fabris (crime reporter)
 Natarjsha Kramer
 Tessa Hardy (court reporter)
 Alex Heinke
 Shannon Marshall-McCormack
 Nick Kelly
 Bridgette O'Brien
 Meg Sydes
 Lily Greer
 Anna Rawlings
 Aislin Kriukelis (Today Queensland Reporter)
 Mia Glover (Today Queensland Reporter)

*Bold indicates the senior reporters

Sport 

 Michael Atkinson
 Adam Jackson
 Ben Dobbin
 Mark Gottlieb

Notable former reporters 

 Alex Bernhardt
 Neil Doorley – now a Senior Media Adviser with Queensland Government
 Spencer Jolly – now retired
 Joel Dry (2011–2018) – now with Seven News Brisbane
 Alyshia Gates – now with the Special Broadcasting Service
 Brittney Kleyn – now with ABC News

 Melissa Mallet (2009–2011)
 Paris Martin – now with 10 News First Sydney
 Ashley McDermid
 Cameron Price (2008–2011)
 Nat Wallace – now with A Current Affair
 Sophie Walsh (2011–2016) – now with Nine News Sydney
 Phil Willmington – now retired
 Lane Calcutt (state political reporter); now a Senior Media Adviser with Queensland Government

References

External links

Australian television news shows
Nine News
Black-and-white Australian television shows
Television shows set in Queensland
1957 Australian television series debuts
1960s Australian television series
1970s Australian television series
1980s Australian television series
1990s Australian television series
2000s Australian television series
2010s Australian television series